The mixed team sprint speed skating competition of the 2016 Winter Youth Olympics was held at Hamar Olympic Hall on 17 February 2016.

Results
The races were held at 10:30.

References 

Mixed team sprint